2017 Tokyo Verdy season.

J2 League

References

External links
 J.League official site

Tokyo Verdy
Tokyo Verdy seasons